Carnegie Mellon University in Qatar (Arabic: جامعة كارنيجي ميلون في قطر), is one of the degree-granting branch campuses of Carnegie Mellon University, located in Doha, Qatar. It is Carnegie Mellon's first undergraduate branch campus, is a member of the Qatar Foundation, and began graduating students in May 2008.

Carnegie Mellon Qatar currently has approximately 400 students, 60 faculty and postdoctoral researchers, and 90 staff.

History
Carnegie Mellon University's campus in Qatar was established in 2004. It was the fourth U.S. higher education institution to establish a campus in Qatar. The establishment of the campuses was spearheaded by Sheikha Moza bint Nasser, the mother of Qatar's current Emir Tamim bin Hamad al Thani.

Academics
Carnegie Mellon Qatar is part of Education City, a campus on the outskirts of Doha that currently houses eight other university campuses from the United States and Europe. Education City's other institutions include Georgetown University School of Foreign Service, Weill Cornell Medical College, Virginia Commonwealth University, Texas A&M, Northwestern University, HEC Paris, and University College London.

The degrees issued by Carnegie Mellon are the same degrees and curriculum that students receive at the Pittsburgh campus. Undergraduate degrees are offered in Computer Science, Business Administration, Information Systems, Computational Biology, and Biological Sciences (a degree offered in conjunction with Weill Cornell Medical College in Qatar).

Funding 
The campus facilities and upkeep to them is entirely covered by the Qatar Foundation. Carnegie Mellon also received money each year to run the campus and pay faculty. It is estimated that Carnegie Mellon has received between $50 and $60 million per year from Qatar to run the campus. Tuition for the school was $49,610 in 2015.

Faculty 
As of December 2015, the campus had 62 faculty members. In a Washington Post article, the dean of the university's Qatar campus, Ilker Baybars, called faculty recruiting “the most difficult part of [his] job”, noting that it is difficult to persuade tenured professors to leave America for Doha. In order to persuade professors to teach at the Doha campus, the university has provided incentives such as salary premiums, generous housing arrangements, and research funding .

Buildings
Carnegie Mellon Qatar is housed in a building designed by architects Legorreta + Legorreta. The university began occupancy in August 2008. All academics, student affairs, operations, and events are held in the building.

Gallery

References

External links 

 website

American international schools
Universities in Qatar
Qatar
Education City
Educational institutions established in 2004
2004 establishments in Qatar
Ricardo Legorreta buildings